The Nein is the eponymously titled debut EP by The Nein.  It was released on October 19, 2004, on Sonic Unyon.

Track listing
All songs written and composed by Casey Burns, Finn Cohen, and Robert Biggers.

 "Five Extinctions" – 5:15
 "Handout" – 3:50
 "War Is on the Stereo" – 3:48
 "House Atreides" – 3:20
 "Giorgio" – 4:01
 "Clearwater" – 3:48

Personnel

The Nein
 Finn Cohen – Vocals, guitar
 Casey Burns – bass
 Robert Biggers – drum, keyboards
 Zeke Graves – Keyboards, tambourine

Production
 Jayce Murphy – Engineering, mixing
 Nick Peterson – Engineering
 John Byrd – Engineering
 John Golden – Mastering
 Finn Cohen – Programming
 Casey Burns – Cutting, graphic design
 Dale Flattum – Cover collage
 Polah Beah – Photography
 Meredith Hinshaw – Photography

References

External links

The Nein at Rate Your Music
Sonic Unyon's website

2004 EPs